A settlement in Alberta is a subdivided area of land that was surveyed prior to the establishment of the Third System of Survey under the Dominion Land Survey. Settlements do not necessarily fit within the Alberta Township Survey grid system.

List of settlements 
Alberta has 47 unique settlements according to Alberta Boundary Data.  Most settlements are in rural areas while some are located within or adjacent to urban areas.

See also 
List of cities in Alberta
List of communities in Alberta
List of designated places in Alberta
List of hamlets in Alberta
List of Indian reserves in Alberta
List of localities in Alberta
List of municipal districts in Alberta
List of municipalities in Alberta
List of summer villages in Alberta
List of towns in Alberta
List of villages in Alberta
Métis in Alberta
Specialized municipalities of Alberta

References